The Maine Capitol Police is the capitol police agency of the state of Maine responsible for policing the Maine State House, the state capitol, and other state agency buildings, grounds and properties in the state. Capitol Police officers are located at the Capitol Complex, but have statewide jurisdiction where required.

History
In 1967/8, Maine Governor Kenneth M. Curtis appointed Robert Sears, a custodian and part-time police officer, to police the State House grounds. He had title of "Building and Grounds Officer", wore a uniform in the style of the Maine Warden Service, with a patch that read “State House Police”, and used a Cushman motor scooter. Sears controlled parking around the State House and State Office Building, and provided security on the premises. General security services for the Capitol complex were provided by night watchpersons, part of the Bureau of Public Improvements.

The Capitol Security Police Force was formed in 1968, as part of the Bureau of Public Improvements. The force consisted of the Chief, Officer Sears and a number of watchpersons, and was added to by a number of security guards in 1971 when the Maine State Library, Maine State Museum and Maine State Archives opened in the Cultural Building next to the State House. The guards were retitled Capitol Security Police Officers in 1977, following the bombings of several public buildings in New England and the Central Maine Power Company in Augusta. The force was formed as the Bureau of Capitol Security within the Maine Department of Public Safety. In 1982, the Capitol Police took on responsibility for the Augusta Mental Health Institute and grounds, and the force had a total of eleven officers. In 1979, Donald Suitter was appointed chief. 

In 1990, the night watchpersons were reassigned to Capitol security, bringing the state government buildings in Hallowell within the responsibility of the Capitol Police. Officer Robert Sears, the original Capitol Police Officer, retired in 1994. 

In 2004, budget meant the bureau could no longer provide round-the-clock services. By 2006, when Donald Suitter retired, further budget cuts had reduced the force to three watchpersons and six police officers. Russell Gauvin, a retired Portland Police Department captain, was appointed as his replacement and began to modernize the Capitol Police, including the introduction of telescopic batons, a dedicated channel for police radios and a computer-aided dispatch system. In 2009, the Legislature changed the name of the Bureau of Capitol Security to the Bureau of Capitol Police, and gave the Public Safety Commissioner the power to expand the jurisdiction of the Police from "all state owned or controlled property in Augusta" to full, statewide jurisdiction, which they did.  

In 2011, the Capitol Police took on further responsibilities for policing the state buildings, from the Augusta Police Department. The number of police officers was increased, and in 2012 the police started screening visitors to the State House for weapons. In 2013, the police were further increased in size to 13 officers, supported by two watchpersons and four screeners, with the establishment of a permanent presence at the Riverview Psychiatric Center.

2020 presidential election aftermath
In January 2021, Capitol Police chief Russel Gauvin apologised for a series of social media posts he posted "deriding mask mandates, questioning the results of the presidential election and supporting a police officer who called for violence against Black Lives Matter protesters". Governor Janet Mills and Public Safety Commissioner Michael Sauschuck said they were "troubled and concerned" by the posts, and placed Gauvin under investigation. On 20 January, Gauvin was temporarily replaced by Lt. Robert Elliot following a letter from over 70 members of the Legislature expressing concern about his leadership.

Duties
The Capitol Police are established by Title 25, s2908 of the Maine Revised Statutes. They are responsible for policing the State House and other State buildings within the Capitol Area campus, operating a metal detector and x-ray machine at the entrance to the State House. They also police the buildings on the opposite side of the Kennebec River, the "East Side Campus" (until 2004 the Augusta Mental Health Institute), with an office at Riverview Psychiatric Center. Non-sworn watchpersons are responsible for providing security at around 50 state-owned facilities in Augusta and Hallowell outside normal business hours. 

During the financial year 2019-20, the Capitol Police logged 47,262 events, incidents or activities, of which 77 turned into criminal investigations, including assault, trespass and theft. 191 traffic summonses/warnings were issued and 492 parking tickets, in addition to investigating 8 traffic collisions. The Police issued 56 permits for activities around the State House, in Capitol Park, or elsewhere in the Capitol Area.

See also
 List of law enforcement agencies in Maine
 Capitol police

References

External links
 

State law enforcement agencies of Maine
Capitol police
Government agencies established in 1974
1974 establishments in Maine